The Ecclesiastical Museum of Siatista is a museum in the town of Siatista, in the Kozani Prefecture, Greece.

Description
Opened in 2001, the Ecclesiastical Museum is located on the 1st floor of a building in the precinct of the Metropolitan Palace of Siatista. The exhibits include icons, wood carvings, small objects, books, vestments which have been collected from the temples and monasteries of the area.

References

Citations

Sources

External links
 Ecclesiastical Museum of Siatista: Information, Hellenic Ministry of Culture and Sports.

Siatista
Siatista
Museums established in 2001
2001 establishments in Greece